La Tour de contrôle infernale (or La Tour 2 contrôle infernale on the billing, often used in the medias) is a French and Belgian surreal crime comedy film written, produced and starred by Éric Judor and Ramzy Bedia, released in 2016.

It is a prequel of the film La Tour Montparnasse Infernale, directed by Charles Nemes and released in 2001.

Synopsis 
1982. Ernest Krakenkrick and Bachir Bouzouk are about to become pilots in the French army. But after the bad consequences of a test undertaken with the centrifuge, they are forced to give up their dream. They are eventually given the position of baggage handler at Orly-West Airport in Paris. But one night, there is a hostage-taking in the airport and the "Moustachious", a group of terrorists, take hold of the control tower. While the Home Secretary tries to make a deal with the criminals, Ernest and Bachir do their best to save the airport...

Cast
 Éric Judor as Ernest Krakenkriek
 Ramzy Bedia as Bachir Bouzouk
 Marina Foïs as Karine Lanceval (mother of Stéphanie Lanceval of the first movie)
 Philippe Katerine as Colonel Janouniou
 Serge Riaboukine as "Le Méchant" (literally: the mean guy) (brother of Machin of the first movie)
 Lionel Beyeke as Jean-Peter McCallaway
 William Gay as General Mangedeurme
 Grégoire Oestermann as The minister of the interior
 Michel Nabokoff as the father 
 Charles Nemes as the consultant (Cameo appearance)
 Joel Jernidier as Zavier Le Black
 Alexis Van Stratum as Jean-Loup Muselime

Reception
La Tour 2 contrôle infernale received mixed reviews.

Box office 
The movie attracted 211 000 cinema-goers during the first week after being released, against 2.1 millions in total for La Tour Montparnasse infernale.

Notes and references

External links 
 (FR) La Tour de contrôle infernale on AlloCiné
 (EN) 

2016 films
2010s French-language films
French comedy films
2016 comedy films
French sequel films
Films directed by Éric Judor
2010s French films